The second generation Mercedes-Benz SLK, internally designated model R171, is a two-passenger, front-engine, rear-drive, retractable hardtop roadster, unveiled at the 74th Geneva International Motor Show—and manufactured and marketed for model years 2004–2010. Currently in its third generation and manufactured at Mercedes' Bremen plant, the SLK nameplate designates Sportlich (sporty), Leicht (light), and Kurz (compact).

The R171 features a number of revisions compared to its predecessor, the R170: a 30mm longer wheelbase, increased length (72mm) and width (65mm), 40% increased use of high strength steel, seven-speed automatic transmission, adaptive two-stage airbags, head/thorax sidebags and a revised roof mechanism (marketed as the Vario roof) deployable in 22 seconds (previously 25 seconds) with a rotary-pivoting rear window enabling a more compact folded roof stack and trunk storage increased by 63 litres with the roof retracted. Optional features include remote operation of the retractable hardtop as well as an innovative forced air, neck-level heating system integral to the headrests, marketed as Airscarf.

The fully galvanized bodywork, which features 19 percent improvement in static bending and 46 percent improvement in torsional strength with the roof down, also features a 3% improvement in aerodynamic efficiency, with a Cd value of 0.32. The design has been aerodynamically optimized to minimize interior draughts with the top retracted and includes a fabric windblocker which can be pulled up over the two roll-over bars. Mercedes marketed the R171's tapering front end styling by designer Steve Mattin as "Formula One-inspired".

In 2008, the SLK reached sales of 500,000. The R171 made Car and Driver's Ten Best list for 2005 and won the Canadian Car of the Year Best New Convertible award.

The R171 SLK were the last series that a manual transmission was available in a 6 Cylinder Mercedes-Benz Convertible. The successor to the R171, R172, only offered manual transmission in their 4-cylinder vehicles.

Car and Driver reviewed the manual transmission in November 2004 and rated the transmission glowingly as "..the love child of a Honda S2000 and BMW M3...". The review further wrote that with the SLK350 the engine "...has a willing personality that is perfectly suited to a manual transmission-you'll definitely not regret choosing it over the automatic."

Specifications

Engines

*All specifications with standard equipment.

For the facelifts: SLK 280 fuel economy was improved while  emissions were reduced. In addition to power boosts on the SLK 200 KOMPRESSOR and SLK 350, the engine speed limit was raised to 6800 rpm, with temporary boost to 7200 rpm across the family (except SLK 55 AMG). Other changes include a higher compression ratio, a new intake manifold and an extensively modified valvetrain.

Performance

*Acceleration time with manual transmission.

**Acceleration time with automatic transmission.

Transmission

Factory options

AMG bodystyling
High capacity battery
COMAND APS control and display system for radio/navigation
Bi-xenon headlights with headlight washers, auto leveling. (SLK 200K, SLK 280, SLK 350, SLK 55 [adds cornering adjustment])
CD changer in glove box (6 disc)
Alarm system with tow-away protection
'Homelink' garage door opener
Pre-installation for roof carrier systems
Basic carrier bars
Interior lighting package (standard SLK 350, SLK 55 AMG)
Asphymetric mirror glass (limited markets)
THERMOTRONIC automatic climate control
Air Scarf: Heated air directed from the headrest to the back of the neck. (includes fabric windblocker)
Leather or wood/leather steering wheel/shifter (excluding SLK 55 AMG)
Parktronic parking aids (front sensors are referred to as Quickpark)
Rain sensing wipers.
Tire pressure loss warning system
Heated windscreen washer
Heated seats (standard SLK 55 AMG)
Lowered sports suspension (only available in conjunction with 17" light alloys and tyre pressure loss warning)
Sport Package (limited markets, not offered for SLK 55 AMG)
Harman Kardon LOGIC7 surround sound system
Fabric windblocker no longer included with US cars (except with AIRSCARF option)
Transparent windblocker
Sirius Satellite Radio (USA only)
Designo: Special Paint colours and leathers, choices and prices depend on region, US pricing is $8000.
Power-folding side mirrors (limited markets)
Handsfree phone kit
iPod integration
Audio input with pre-facelift COMAND, post-facelift cars have the Media Interface option
8 way power seats
Lumbar adjustment (not available on SLK 55)
Performance Package (AMG 030 Package, only for the SLK 55)
'Edit10n' 10 year Anniversary Package (special paint colour, red trim on the interior)

AMG models

SLK 55 AMG
0- quoted at 4.9 seconds (Car & Driver Magazine reported 0-60 mph in 4.3 seconds.)
Increased brake capacity. 345x30mm brake discs (Pre-2008-model-year cars have 6-piston front calipers with perforated and slotted rotors, and 4-piston rear calipers. Later models have a mix of brakes depending on options and market: either the original 6-piston fronts or the 4-piston fronts from the C55. Mercedes made this change not only to cut costs but also to reduce complaints about brake squeal from customers not used to high performance brakes.)
Additional engine oil cooler (behind right-hand bumper vents)
Lowered/stiffened suspension (springs, shocks, sway bars)
18-inch alloy wheels with 225/40 front and 245/35 rear tyres. 
AMG body kit, with distinctive gills in front bumpers
Chrome-accented fog lights
Napa leather interior
Quad exhaust
Smoked taillights and CHMSL
2008 facelift included a controller upgrade to the AMG SPEEDSHIFT 7G-TRONIC transmission, shifts 10% faster than previous model.
SLK 55 Sport/030/P30 (an option package on top of the standard SLK 55 AMG) Developed by the AMG PERFORMANCE STUDIO, AMG performance package adds following:
Nurburgring suspension
Improved pads and rotors (currently the only sure way to get the pre-2008 6-piston front brakes and 4-piston rears). AMG high-performance braking system with composite brake discs at the front wheels. Internally ventilated and perforated composite brake discs (360x32mm) with 6-piston fixed calipers at the front. Internally ventilated and perforated brake discs (330x26mm) with 4-piston fixed calipers at the rear
Carbon fibre interior accents
AMG 18-inch multi-piece light-alloy wheels in a twin-spoke design, 7.5x18 rim with 225/40R18 tyres at the front and 8.5x18 rim with 245/35R18 tyres at the rear
AMG performance steering wheel with smaller diameter, flattened lower section and silver-coloured aluminium shift paddles (plus aluminium trim element)
delimited top speed (which is actually now standard on most SLK 55s)

As of 2006 AMG has released several new models, but these are not available in all export markets:
SLK 55 Asia Cup (Track Sport) Limited to 35 cars LHD and RHD.
SLK 55 'F1 Safety Car'

SLK 55 AMG Black Series (2006-2008)
Engine performance increase comes largely from the long tube headers and a revised ECU.

The vehicle went on sale in Germany beginning in July 2006 with MSRP of €107,300 (incl. 16% VAT).

Special Editions
"Edition 10" (2007): a version commemorating the 10th anniversary of SLK-Class vehicles. The concept vehicle originally appeared in 2006 Paris Motor show and was based on SLK 280 with 7G-TRONIC transmission, matte-grey metallic body; dark-grey painted, high-sheen light-alloy wheels in a ten-spoke design with 225/45R17 front and 245/40R17 rear tires; black leather seats and interior with silver-coloured under layer; AIRSCARF neck-level heating system, THERMOTRONIC automatic climate-control system, PARKTRONIC parking aid, COMAND system with Europe-wide navigation.

The production versions were available in SLK 200 KOMPRESSOR, SLK 280, SLK 350 models, which include 'allanite grey Magno' body, wheel and tires, and interior from the show car. AIRSCARF, THERMOTRONIC, and COMAND were offered separately.

2LOOK Edition (2009): a limited appearance package available for SLK 200 KOMPRESSOR, SLK 300 and SLK 350 models, which included calcite white, black, obsidian black metallic, or designo mystic white (300 units total for obsidian black metallic and designo mystic white) body 18-inch 5-twin-spoke titanium silver or chrome shadow alloy wheels with 225/40R18 front and 245/35R18 rear tires, discreet emblems on the wings and a windblocker of transparent acrylic glass, nappa leather seats with the seat centre panels in white and the contoured bolsters in black, contrasting black-and-white doors and centre armrest in leather.

The vehicle was unveiled in the 2009 Geneva Motor Show.

Facelift (2008-2011)

The updated model includes a revised front bumper with a modified air-dam arrangement and a more pronounced arrow shape. The rear end was modified by introducing a diffuser-style lower section that makes the Roadster appear more powerful when viewed from behind. The larger exterior mirrors feature LED indicators with a pronounced arrow shape, while the range of light-alloy wheels is also almost entirely new. Interior was optimised to be more driver-oriented. Instrument cluster was updated to include NTG 2.5 audio and telematics with optional LINGUATRONIC voice-operated control, optional harman/kardon Logic7 sound system.

A "gullwing red" leather option, inspired by the original 300 SL gullwing, is added. Further new additions include nappa leather appointments in "natural beige", which complement the new "pale burr walnut" and "black ash grain" wood trims perfectly.

Direct steering assist system with variable steering assistance becomes an option (standard in SLK 55 AMG). SLK 55 AMG included a new apron with a black-painted cross strut and side air outlets as well as darkened headlamps.

The facelifted R171 was unveiled in 2008 NAIAS and went on sale in April 2008.

In November 2012, Road & Track ranked the SLK350 9th in their Best All Around Sports Car. In particular, Road Test Editor Patrick Hong noted that the facelifted model "... with its improved manual transmission, is finally worth considering as a real sports car. The previous model was more of a cruiser, but this new SLK350 is different in that its engine is peppier, coming on when needed." The article further noted that the SLK 350 had the best ride out of all the vehicles tested with a "solid yet velvety ride quality" and that it's a sports car with a "bias towards grand touring over high performance."

References

Notes

Bibliography

External links
Press Kit: Intelligent dynamism - the new-generation Mercedes-Benz SLK
Mercedes-Benz SLK 300 official site - Manufacturer's website
Official AMG SLK55 site - AMG website

R171
R171
Roadsters
Cars introduced in 2004